Klara Myrén (born 25 May 1991) is a Swedish ice hockey player and former member of the Swedish national ice hockey team. She represented Sweden at the 2010 Winter Olympics. Her college ice hockey career was played with the Vermont Catamounts women's ice hockey program of the NCAA Division I.

Playing career
Myrén played with Leksands IF Dam of the Riksserien, during the 2010–11 season. Statistically, she registered 11 goals and 13 assists in 21 games.

Team Sweden
Myrén was a member of the Swedish under-18 national team from 2006 to 2009. As a member, she participated in the IIHF U18 Women's World Championships in 2008 and 2009. At the 2009 tournament in Füssen, Germany, she won a bronze medal.

With the senior national team, she took part in the IIHF Women's World Championships in 2008, 2009, and 2012. She was the youngest member of the Swedish team that participated in the women's ice hockey tournament at the 2010 Winter Olympics. During the 2010 Winter Games in Vancouver, she accumulated two assists in five games played, as Sweden finished in fourth place.

Career stats

Team Sweden

References

External links 
 
 

1991 births
Living people
Brynäs IF Dam players
Ice hockey players at the 2010 Winter Olympics
Leksands IF Dam players
Olympic ice hockey players of Sweden
People from Borlänge Municipality
Swedish women's ice hockey forwards
Vermont Catamounts women's ice hockey players
Sportspeople from Dalarna County